Cadoc is an electoral ward in Barry, Vale of Glamorgan, Wales. It elects four county councillors to the Vale of Glamorgan Council and three town councillors to Barry Town Council.

Description 
The Cadoc ward covers the northeast area of Barry including the neighbourhoods of Cadoxton (named after Saint Cadoc) and Palmerstown. Three county councillors are elected from the ward to the Vale of Glamorgan Council and three town councillors to Barry Town Council.

According to the 2011 census the population of the ward was 10,002.

Election results

Town Council 
Three Labour councillors were elected to Barry Town Council at the May 2017 elections. Long serving councillor (and former Labour leader and town mayor) Jane Andrews died in January 2018 leading to a by-election on 24 May 2018.

County Council 
At every county election since 1995 the Cadoc ward elected three Labour Party councillors to the Vale of Glamorgan Council. In May 2017, reflecting the growth in the Conservative vote in the county, one of the seats was won by the Conservative Party.

In 2022 the number of county councillors was increased to four, as a result of recommendations from the Local Democracy and Boundary Commission for Wales.

At the 1985, 1989 and 1993 county elections, Cadoc elected a county councillor to South Glamorgan County Council. The Labour candidate won each of these elections.

See also
 Castleland
 Court (Barry electoral ward)

References 

Barry, Vale of Glamorgan
Electoral wards of South Glamorgan
Vale of Glamorgan electoral wards